Vibez may refer to:

 "Vibez" (DaBaby song), 2020 song by DaBaby
 "Vibez" (Zayn song), 2021 song by Zayn

See also
 Vibes (disambiguation)